1962–1966, also known as the Red Album, is a compilation album of hit songs by the English rock band the Beatles, spanning the years indicated in the title. Released with its counterpart 1967–1970 (the "Blue Album") in 1973, the double LP peaked at number 3 in the United Kingdom. In the United States, it topped the Cash Box albums chart and peaked at number 3 on the Billboard Top LPs & Tape chart while 1967–1970 reached the top spot. The album was re-released in September 1993 on compact disc, charting at number 3 in the UK.

The album was instigated by Apple Records manager Allen Klein shortly before he was dismissed from his position. Even though the group had success with cover versions of songs, particularly "Twist and Shout", 1962–1966 contains only songs composed by the Beatles. The album omits any George Harrison compositions from the era, such as "Taxman", as the content is entirely Lennon–McCartney originals.

As with 1967–1970, the compilation was created by Apple and EMI/Capitol Records in response to a bootleg collection titled Alpha Omega, which had been sold on television the previous year. Print advertising for the two records made a point of declaring them "the only  collection of the Beatles". The success of the two official double LP compilations inspired Capitol's repackaging of the Beach Boys' 1960s hits, starting with the 1974 album Endless Summer.

Album covers 
For the group's 1963 debut LP Please Please Me, photographer Angus McBean took the distinctive colour photograph of the group looking down over the stairwell inside EMI House (EMI's London headquarters in Manchester Square, now demolished). The cover for the 1963 EP The Beatles (No. 1) used a picture from the same shoot.

In 1969, the Beatles asked McBean to recreate this shot. Although one of the 1969 photographs was originally intended for the planned Get Back album, it was not used when that project saw eventual release in 1970 as Let It Be. Instead, another 1969 photograph, along with an unused one from the 1963 photo shoot, were used for both this LP and the cover of 1967–1970.

The inner gatefold photo for both LPs is from the "Mad Day Out" photo session in London on Sunday 28 July 1968.

The album cover was designed by Tom Wilkes.

Release variations 
 Original 1973 UK release: Apple PCSP 7171-2
 Original 1973 US release: Apple SKBO-3403 (whole and sliced apples on red background)
 Second 1976 US pressings: Capitol SKBO-3403 (Capitol target logo on back of album cover, red labels with "Capitol" in light red at bottom. There are also copies erroneously pressed with the BLUE labels for the 1967–1970 pressings.)
 1978 first US red vinyl issue: Capitol SEBX-11842 (Capitol dome logo on back of album cover, large dome logo at top of labels)

The British and American versions of the vinyl album contain notable differences; for example, "Help!" on the American edition includes the same pseudo-James Bond intro as the mix found on the American Help! soundtrack LP, while the same song on the British edition does not. Also, the British LP uses the stereo "whispering intro" mix of "I Feel Fine", while the U.S. LP uses the mono mix from Beatles '65, which is drenched in additional reverb. (See Mix Variations below.) In the liner notes associating the songs with their original albums, the U.S. editions referenced the Capitol albums while the UK editions used the British albums.

The first compact disc version was released on 20 September 1993. It was released on two discs for the price of two albums, though it could have fit onto a single disc; EMI stated that this was done to match the release of 1967–1970. The CD version used new digital masters. The first four tracks on the CD release are in mono; the rest of the tracks are in stereo. The tracks "All My Loving", "Can't Buy Me Love", "A Hard Day's Night", "And I Love Her" and "Eight Days a Week" made their CD stereo debut with this release. 
The 1993 versions were also issued on vinyl in the UK.

2010 remastered version 
EMI announced on 10 August 2010, that the album had been remastered for a second time and, once again, would be released as a two-CD package. The album was released worldwide on 18 October 2010, and 19 October 2010 in North America.

2014 mastered vinyl 
The album was reissued on 180g vinyl in 2014, prepared from the original UK 1973 compilation master. The fake stereo mixes of the Andy White version of "Love Me Do" (with Starr on tambourine) and "She Loves You" were replaced by the true mono versions, but while the Side 1 label indicated “Please Please Me” and “From Me To You” being mono, they were, in fact, the stereo versions.

Track listing 
 Although it appeared on the Vee-Jay compilation Jolly What! The Beatles and Frank Ifield on Stage, this is the first appearance of "From Me to You" on a U.S. Capitol album.
 "A Hard Day's Night" also makes its U.S. Capitol album debut here, having previously only appeared on the United Artists soundtrack album of the film of the same name.

Mix variations

Charts

Weekly charts 

Original release

1993 reissue

2010 reissue

Year-end charts

Certifications and sales
In the US, the album sold 1,215,338 LPs by 31 December 1973 and 5,475,942 LPs by the end of the decade.

See also 
 List of best-selling albums in Austria
 List of best-selling albums in France
 List of best-selling albums in Germany
 List of best-selling albums in the United States
 List of best-selling albums of the 1970s (Japan)
 List of diamond-certified albums in Canada

References

External links 
 Notes on released versions

1973 compilation albums
Albums arranged by George Martin
Albums arranged by Paul McCartney
Albums produced by George Martin
Apple Records compilation albums
The Beatles compilation albums